"Love Grows (Where My Rosemary Goes)" is the debut single by Edison Lighthouse. The song reached the number one spot on the UK Singles Chart on the week ending 31 January 1970, where it remained for a total of five weeks.
It also became the first number one single of the 1970s (not counting Rolf Harris's "Two Little Boys" which was a holdover from 1969).

Background
"Love Grows (Where My Rosemary Goes)" was written by Tony Macaulay and Barry Mason and was first recorded by Tony Burrows with session musicians. "Love Grows" entered the UK top 40 at No. 12 on 24 January 1970 – an unusually high new entry for a debut act. A week later, the track climbed eleven places to No. 1, becoming the first new UK chart-topper of the 1970s. After a five-week stay at the top, "Love Grows" dropped to No. 4, replaced by "Wand'rin' Star" by Lee Marvin. Whilst at No. 1, Edison Lighthouse held off strong competition from Peter, Paul and Mary ("Leaving on a Jet Plane") and Canned Heat ("Let's Work Together"). Eventually, after a 12-week run, "Love Grows" left the UK top 40 on 18 April 1970.

When "Love Grows (Where My Rosemary Goes)" became a hit, a group needed to be assembled rapidly to perform the song on Top of the Pops. The pair found a group called Greenfield Hammer, who a week later appeared on Top of the Pops as 'Edison Lighthouse' to mime to the fastest-climbing number-one hit record in history. Burrows sang the song on the programme on four separate weeks in January and February 1970 and on each show he also appeared singing lead for either Brotherhood of Man ("United We Stand") or White Plains ("My Baby Loves Lovin'"), who also had hits during that same month-long stretch.

In the U.S., the Edison Lighthouse version of "Love Grows (Where My Rosemary Goes)" came close to facing competition from a cover version that ABC-Dunhill Records wished to cut with well-established top 40 hitmakers the Grass Roots; however, the latter group passed on the song, reportedly because Grass Roots frontman Rob Grill balked at singing a love song that might be presumed to reference co-member Warren Entner's wife Rosemarie Frankland. Issued in the U.S. in February 1970, "Love Grows" by Edison Lighthouse entered the top 40 of the Billboard Hot 100 dated 28 February 1970 at No. 68, to reach a peak position of No. 5 on 28 March, remaining there for two weeks. After a 12-week run, "Love Grows" exited the US top 40 on 23 May.

"Love Grows" reached number 3 on the Canadian RPM Top Singles chart and number 3 in South Africa in February 1970.

Toward the end of 2021, the song saw a massive resurgence due to it becoming popular on TikTok. Between December 25, 2021 and January 3, 2022, the song saw a growth of 1,490% in its on-demand audio streams, and moved onto Spotify's U.S. Top 200 Chart.

Charts

Weekly charts

Year-end charts

Certifications

Cover versions
Jerry Vale covered the song on his 1970 album Let It Be.
Anni-Frid Lyngstad covered the song in 1970 as "Där du går lämnar kärleken spår" ("Where you go, love leaves traces").
Uschi Glas covered the song in 1970 in German as "Wenn dein Herz brennt".
The song's lyricist Barry Mason recorded it for his 1976 album The Songwriter.
In 1984, Hong Kong singer Samuel Hui covered the song in Cantonese as "Tsui hei foon lei" (最喜歡你, which means "like you the most").
British indie pop band the Siddeleys covered the song on the 1990 compilation Alvin Lives (In Leeds) – Anti Poll Tax Trax.
Izabella Scorupco covered the song on her 1991 album IZA.
In 1987, the Reels covered the song as a single.
In 1995, Swedish dansband Distance (later Frida & Dansbandet) covered the song with lyrics in the Swedish language, as "När du ler" ("When you smile").
The Grass Roots, who in 1970 declined to cover the Edison Lighthouse original, included a live version of the song - as "Love Grows (Rosemary)" - on their 2000 Live at Last album, the song having been inaugurated as a Grass Roots concert staple by 1996.
In 2002, the Not Lame Recordings CD Right to Chews—a collection of modern bands performing cover versions of bubblegum pop songs – included Beagle's version of the song. 
In 2007, Little Man Tate did a cover of this song at their concerts at the Boardwalk, Sheffield and at the Bolton Soundhouse.
Freedy Johnston covered the song on his 2001 album Right Between the Promises.
Brødrene Olsen recorded the song for his 2002 album Songs.
Les Fradkin covered the song on his 2004 album Perfect World.
In 2012, Dennis Diken with Bell Sound recorded a version for a fundraising album titled Super Hits of the Seventies for radio station WFMU.
Darren Hayman, under the name Papernut Cambridge, recorded the song for his 2015 album Nutlets 1967-1980.
Dennis Brown recorded a cover in 1970 for Studio One in Jamaica, and released it in the UK on the Bamboo label (BAM 56A).
Barry Biggs also released a reggae version in 1970, on the Jamaican Tiger label (T28), and the UK Dynamic Sounds label (DYN-401-B).
Lloyd Miller released another reggae version in 1978, on the UK Trojan label (9033-A).

In the media

The song appears in the closing scenes of the film Shallow Hal (in which the female lead played by Gwyneth Paltrow is named Rosemary).
It serves as the musical theme of the film Little Manhattan (wherein the female love interest is also named Rosemary), performed by Freedy Johnston.
It was featured in a fifth season episode of The Sopranos ("All Happy Families...") during a hit on a friend of Little Carmine Lupertazzi.
It is referred to in the narration of Reservoir Dogs, as part of the fictional "K-BILLY's Super Sounds of the '70s" radio show, but the song itself is not played.
It is parodied in the game Al Emmo and the Lost Dutchman's Mine, at the title theme for Act 3: Shallow Al.
It acts as the closing theme to The Kennedys television series referring to Rosemary Kennedy, the often forgotten, mentally disabled sister of John F. Kennedy and Robert F. Kennedy.
It plays during a romantic montage during the 2018 Netflix production  The Kissing Booth.

See also
 List of 1970s one-hit wonders in the United States

References

External links
 

1969 songs
1970 debut singles
Edison Lighthouse songs
UK Singles Chart number-one singles
Irish Singles Chart number-one singles
Number-one singles in New Zealand
Songs written by Tony Macaulay
Songs written by Barry Mason
Bell Records singles
Bubblegum pop songs
Tony Burrows songs